José Miguel Guridi y Alcocer (December 23, 1763 – October 4, 1828) was a Spanish-Mexican politician. He was also the 21st President of the Spanish Cadíz Cortes.

1763 births
1828 deaths
19th-century Mexican politicians